The Impossible: Mission TV Series – Pt. 1 is an album of unreleased material by De La Soul. It contains material recorded over a period of years (dating as far back as De La Soul Is Dead), and was made available through the group's imprint AOI Records. The album's title, and cover, are a reference to the popular action adventure TV series Mission: Impossible.  An alternative version of the album presumably catered to the group's Japanese audience, The Impossible Mission: Operation Japan, is also available.

Track listing

Standard version
 Impossible Intro
 Live @ The Dugout '87
 Voodoo Circus (produced by Supa Dave West)
 Friends (produced by J Dilla)
 What The Fuck part one (De La Soul's Poster)
 Go Out And Get It
 Beef
 Reverse Ya Steps (produced by Oh No)
 You Got It feat. Butta Verses
 What The Fuck part two
 Just Havin' A Ball
 What If?
 Relax!! (produced by J Dilla)
 Wasn't For You (Remix) (produced by Ge-Ology) (The original version can be found on the Handsome Boy Modeling School album "White People")
 Freestyle (Dat Shit) 2006
 What The Fuck part three
 Freedom Train (produced by 9th Wonder)

Alternate version
Impossible Intro
Live @ The Dugout '87
Voodoo Circus (produced by Supa Dave West)
Friends (produced by J Dilla)
What The F*** #1
Go Out And Get I
Respect (produced by Supa Dave West)
Beef
Reverse Ya Steps (produced by Oh No)
You Got It feat. Butta Verses
What The F*** #2
Just Havin' A Ball
What If?
Relax!! (produced by J Dilla)
Wasn't For You (Remix) (produced by Ge-Ology)
The Corner
Freestyle (Dat Shit) 2006
What The F*** #3
Freedom Train
Live in Tokyo feat. SPD, KAN

References

De La Soul albums
Albums produced by J Dilla
Albums produced by Oh No (musician)
Albums produced by 9th Wonder
Albums produced by Kanye West
Albums produced by Diamond D
Albums produced by Prince Paul (producer)
2006 compilation albums